These are Lists of rulers in the Low Countries.

 List of counts of Artois
 List of Belgian monarchs
 List of lords and margraves of Bergen op Zoom
 List of counts van Bergh
 List of dukes of Bouillon
 List of lords of Bouillon
 List of dukes of Brabant (including the counts of Louvain, counts of Brussels, landgraves of Brabant, dukes of Lothier, and rulers of Limburg)
 List of dukes of Burgundy (1384–1795, see also List of counts of Burgundy)
 List of bishops and archbishops of Cambrai
 List of counts of Chiny
 List of counts and dukes of Cleves
 List of lords and counts of Egmont
 List of counts of Flanders (see also List of countesses of Flanders by marriage)
 List of rulers of Frisia (including the kings of Frisia (600–775), counts of Frisia (775–885), and counts of Holland and West-Frisia (885–1433))
 List of counts and dukes of Guelders
 List of counts of Hainaut
 List of counts of Holland and West Frisia (see also List of rulers of Frisia#House of West Frisia)
 List of counts and dukes of Jülich
 List of counts of Loon
 List of rulers of Lorraine (Middle Francia (843–855), Lower Lorraine (959–1190))
 List of bishops and prince-bishops of Liège
 List of rulers of Limburg
 List of monarchs of Luxembourg (including counts, dukes and grand dukes)
 List of rulers of Namur
 List of kings of Holland (1806–1810)
 List of monarchs of the Netherlands (1813–present)
 
 List of abbesses of Thorn Abbey
 List of bishops and archbishops of Utrecht
 List of counts of Zutphen
 Leaders of Frisii, Belgae, Canninefates and Batavi (before 400)

See also
Style of the Dutch sovereign
 Succession to the Dutch throne
 List of counts of East Frisia
 List of governors of the Habsburg Netherlands
 List of Grand Pensionaries (Holland, Zeeland, Batavian Republic)
 List of heirs to the Dutch throne
 List of stadtholders in the Netherlands
 List of monarchs of the Netherlands#Stadtholderate under the House of Orange-Nassau
 List of monarchs of the Netherlands#Stadtholderate under the House of Nassau

Notes

References

Works cited
 
 

Low Countries
Low Countries
Lists of Belgian nobility
Lists of Dutch nobility
Lists of nobility of Luxembourg
Rulers
Rulers